The gaita transmontana or gaita de foles mirandesa is a type of bagpipe native to the Trás-os-Montes region of Portugal.

History
The most ancient records of this instrument date from the 18th century, mostly written. Its culture has been passed since then from father to son until the 20th century, with some small differences from region to region. In Portugal, it can be found mainly in Trás-os-Montes region, specially in Vinhais, Bragança, Miranda and Mogadouro, but also in Guarda and Castelo Branco. 
Some Portuguese regiments from Minho, Trás-os-Montes and Guarda used the bagpipes to mark the marching cadence, although the standard marching pattern of the Portuguese infantry regiments was the same as the French. Northern Portugal, specially above the Douro river, is a very mountainous region, where the sound of bagpipes can be heard miles away due to the resonance effect created by the oppressive humidity and altitude. The gaita transmontana has a peculiarly grave tone, which resulted in an awkwardly low pitch. In fact, numerous written records of French commanders during the Peninsular War noted the intimidating effect the sound had on foot soldiers, specially at night, unfamiliar with such sound.

Only recently this type of bagpipe has been recovered through the gathering of repertoires, aided by the promotion of the instrument from several bagpipe associations from Portugal and Galicia in Spain.

Terminology

Many protest that the term gaita mirandesa is somewhat imprecise, given that the city of Miranda do Douro is only a small area within the territory comprised by Trás-os-montes, where the instrument is traditionally held to have originated, particularly in the comarcas of Vinhais, Bragança, and Mogadouro, in addition to Miranda. For that reason, perhaps it would be more correct to call it "gaita-de-fole transmontana" or just "gaita-de-fole", which it is still called by the oldest players of the instrument. The name "transmontana" serves only to distinguish it from other Iberian bagpipes, such as the Gallician and Asturian varieties.

References

External links
 Sobre a gaita transmontana

Bagpipes
Portuguese musical instruments